Fernando Alonso Díaz (born 29 July 1981) is a Spanish racing driver currently competing for Aston Martin in Formula One. He also won the 24 Hours of Daytona with Wayne Taylor Racing in 2019.

Born in Oviedo, Asturias to a working-class family, Alonso began kart racing at the age of three and achieved success in local, national, and world championships. He progressed to car racing at the age of 17, winning the Euro Open by Nissan in 1999 and was fourth in the International Formula 3000 Championship of 2000. At the 2021 Qatar Grand Prix, Alonso scored his first podium in seven years. At the 2022 Singapore Grand Prix, he broke the record for most starts in Formula One.

At the time of his sabbatical, Alonso had won 32 Grands Prix, 22 pole positions, and 1,899 points from 311 starts. He is currently the only Spanish Formula One driver to have won the World Championship. Alonso won the 2001 Race of Champions Nations Cup with the rally driver Jesús Puras and the motorcyclist Rubén Xaus for Team Spain and thrice entered the Indianapolis 500 in 2017, 2019 and 2020. He has been awarded the Prince of Asturias Award for Sports, the Premios Nacionales del Deporte Sportsman of the Year Award and the Gold Medal of the Royal Order of Sports Merit and has twice been inducted into the FIA Hall of Fame. Alonso runs an esports and junior racing team and is a UNICEF Goodwill Ambassador.

Early life and karting career
Alonso was born on 29 July 1981 to a working-class family in Oviedo, Asturias, Northern Spain. He is the son of the mine shaft explosives factory mechanic and amateur kart driver José Luis Alonso, and his wife, the department store employee Ana Díaz. Alonso has an elder sister, Lorena, who is a doctor.

He was educated at the Holy Guardian Angel Primary School (Spanish: Santo Ángel de la Guarda) in Oviedo from 1985 to 1995 under the Basic Education System (Spanish: Educación General Básica). Alonso attended the Institute Leopoldo Alas Clarín of San Lazaro (Spanish: Instituto Leopoldo Alas Clarín de San Lázaro) until his career in motor racing caused him to leave during his Curso de Orientación Universitaria (English: University Orientation Course) in 2000. He was granted a permit to study away from school, after he disobeyed his mother's orders and seldom attended classes. He achieved a good academic performance by asking his classmates for notes and was unproblematic.

Alonso's father wanted a hobby to share with his children and built a go-kart for Lorena. She was uninterested in karting and a three-year-old Alonso received the kart. The karts' pedals were modified for drive-ability, and the local racing federation granted him a mandatory kart racing license aged five; his father rejected an offer for his son to be a goalkeeper for the RC Celta de Vigo football club. The family lacked the finances required to develop him in karts; they could not purchase rain tyres and forced Alonso to adapt to a wet track on slick tyres. Alonso devised three timing sectors going to school to improve himself daily. His mother sewed his racing overalls and adjusted them as he grew; she also ensured Alonso was academically well off. His father steered the kart early on and was his accountant, counsellor, manager and mechanic.

Aged seven, Alonso won his first kart race in Pola de Laviana. He won the 1988 and 1989 children's junior Championship of the Asturias and Galicia, and progressed to the Cadet class in 1990. Go-kart importer Genís Marcó was impressed by Alonso and mentored him; kart track owner José Luis Echevarria told him about Alonso. Marcó found personal and sponsorship money for Alonso's family to defray financial concerns and allow him to enter European series. He spoke to the six-time Karting World Champion Mike Wilson, who gave Alonso a test session at a track in Parma. Marcó taught Alonso to be conservative and maintain the condition of a kart.

Alonso won the 1990 Asturias and the Basque Country Cadet Championship and finished second in the 1991 Spanish Cadet National Championship. The local karting federation allowed him to enter the 100cc class because he was deemed underage to drive more powerful machinery. At a Catalan Karting Championship meet in Móra d'Ebre, Marcó asked Alonso if he wanted to enter the Spanish Karting Championship. Wilson mentored Alonso; he joined the Italian American Motor Engineering works team in 1993. Alonso won three successive Spanish Junior National Championships from 1993 to 1995.

The results allowed him to progress to the world championships. Alonso was third at the 1995 Commission Internationale de Karting (CIK-FIA) Cadets' Rainbow Trophy. Alonso was a mechanic to younger kart drivers to earn money. He won his fourth Spanish Junior Karting Championship, the Trofeo Estival, the Marlboro Masters, and the CIK-FIA 5 Continents Juniors Cup at the Karting Genk in 1996. In 1997, he took the Italian and Spanish International A championships and was second in the European Championship with nine wins, the Masters Karting Paris Bercy and the Spanish Karting Championship.

Motor racing career

Junior racing career 

Aged 17, Alonso made his car racing debut in the 1999 Euro Open by Nissan with Campos Motorsport, winning the title from Manuel Gião at the final race of the season with six wins and nine pole positions. For 2000, he progressed to the higher-tier International Formula 3000 Championship with the Minardi-backed Team Astromega, after a sponsorship agreement with driver Robert Lechner fell through. Alonso finished second at the Hungaroring and won the season-ending round at Circuit de Spa-Francorchamps for fourth overall with 17 points.

Formula One

Minardi and Renault (2001–2006) 
Cesare Fiorio, the sports director, gave Alonso a test in a Formula One (F1) car at the Circuito de Jerez in December 1999, as part of the Euro Open by Nissan's organising company RPM's agreement to give its series champion an opportunity to test at a higher level.

Alonso worked with the engineering department to improve Giancarlo Fisichella's and Jenson Button's performance, and tested in Spain and the United Kingdom. He drove a Jaguar in an evaluation session against test drivers André Lotterer and James Courtney at the Silverstone Circuit in May 2002. He achieved four podium finishes in 2003 and was sixth in the World Drivers' Championship with 55 points.

Alonso had an improved season: he finished the season-opening  in third position and took three more podium finishes that year. He duelled with McLaren driver Kimi Räikkönen for the World Championship in 2005 due to regulation changes mandating teams not to change tyres during a race and engines had to last for two races before they could be changed. Alonso's car was more reliable than Räikkönen's albeit lacking in speed. Alonso eclipsed Emerson Fittipaldi as the youngest World Drivers' Champion, having won seven victories, six pole positions and fourteen podium finishes for 133 points.

Bookmakers installed Alonso as the favourite to retain the Drivers' Championship. His primary competition was Ferrari driver Michael Schumacher. Alonso won six of the first nine races and finished no lower than second to lead the championship with 84 out of a possible 90 points. Alonso won the race as Schumacher retired due to an engine failure whilst leading. He needed to score one point at the season-ending  for a second title. Alonso won the championship by finishing second and was Formula 1's youngest double World Champion.

McLaren and second stint with Renault (2007–2009) 

He and McLaren team owner Ron Dennis met secretly in Japan after Dennis talked to Alonso about driving for the team in the future and Alonso expressed interest in the idea. Alonso's contract with Renault expired on 31 December 2006, and he was not granted an early release for sponsorship reasons. Renault allowed Alonso to make his first appearance for McLaren in a test session at the Circuito de Jerez in November 2006. His main competitors in 2007 were his teammate Lewis Hamilton and Räikkönen at Ferrari. Alonso achieved four Grand Prix victories in Malaysia, Monaco, Europe and Italy and led the championship until Hamilton overtook him. Alonso finished the event third for third overall with 109 points. He had the same number of points as Hamilton; the tie was broken on count-back as Hamilton finished second more often than Alonso.

Throughout the season, Alonso and Hamilton were involved in a number of incidents, such as the espionage scandal and the flare-up during qualifying for the  when Hamilton disobeyed a team instruction, thus disadvantaging Alonso, and Alonso responded by delaying Hamilton in the pit lane. The tensions culminated in Alonso and McLaren terminating their contract by mutual consent in November. After rejecting offers from several teams, he signed a two-year contract to rejoin Renault from 2008 because of the manufacturer's long-term commitment to F1 and on-track record. Alonso's car lacked power early on due to an imposed moratorium in development and he scored nine points in the first seven races. He was thereafter able to improve his performance later due to aerodynamic developments to the car's and won in Singapore and Japan; the former race saw Renault order his teammate Nelson Piquet Jr. to crash deliberately and trigger the deployment of the safety car in what became known as "crashgate". Alonso scored more points than any other driver in the final five races with 43. He scored 61 points for fifth in the Drivers' Championship.

Alonso was due to become a free agent for  if Renault were lower than third in the Constructors' Championship. After offers from Red Bull Racing and Honda, he re-signed to Renault on a two-year contract. His car proved to be noncompetitive because it lacked a dual diffuser system and outright speed. Alonso eschewed an aerodynamic front wing mandated in an attempt to make overtaking more possible since he did not believe it would help him. Alonso was ninth in the Drivers' Championship with 26 points, his lowest placing since he came sixth in 2003; he maintained his reputation as one of F1's best drivers.

Ferrari (2010–2014) 

McLaren's Hamilton and Button and Red Bull's of Sebastian Vettel and Mark Webber were Alonso's main championship competition. He won five races that season and entered the season-ending  leading by eight points after being 47 behind mid-season following errors. Alonso finished runner-up to Vettel after finishing seventh thereby losing 19 points to Vettel who won the race.

His 2011 season was mixed: his car was built conservatively and lacked aerodynamic grip and tyre handling in qualifying. He extracted additional pace from his car to claim ten podium finishes and win the  after a strategy error from Red Bull. Alonso was fourth overall with 257 points; he was in contention to finish second to eventual champion Vettel following a series of strong finishes until Webber won the season-ending .

His main competition for the title in 2012 was Vettel. Wins in Malaysia, Valencia and Germany and consistent points-scoring finishes allowed him to build a 40-point lead in the Drivers' Championship. Thereafter start-line collisions, a mechanical failure and an improved performance for Vettel eliminated Alonso's points lead. Alonso entered the season-ending  13 points behind Vettel and needed to finish third and for Vettel not to score points for a third championship. He was second and Vettel finished fourth, despite spinning on the opening lap, resigning Alonso to be runner-up for the second time in his career on 278 points.

To begin , Alonso drove an aggressively designed car allowing him to win in China and Spain and consistently scored points. With 242 points, Alonso was second for the third time in his career. His relationship with Ferrari cooled due to his perception the team could not construct a title-winning car. 

Alonso fell to sixth in the Drivers' Championship with 161 points. He qualified faster than his teammate Räikkönen 16 times by an average of more than  second per lap in 2014.

Return to McLaren (2015–2019) 
Alonso had severe disagreements with team principal Marco Mattiacci in 2014 and left Ferrari after contract negotiations to remain at the team fell through. An accident during a pre-season test session at Spain's Circuit de Barcelona-Catalunya in February 2015 saw Alonso sustain a concussion and he was replaced by reserve driver Kevin Magnussen for the season-opening . He endured a difficult season: his car's Honda engine was under-powered and overall speed leaving him vulnerable to being passed. He was dissatisfied with a slow pace, which became evident after multiple radio complaints that year.

He was tenth in the Drivers' Championship with 54 points.

After three consecutive top-ten finishes, Alonso finished 15th in the Drivers' Championship with 17 points.

Following contract negotiations with the McLaren CEO Zak Brown, Alonso signed a multi-year extension with McLaren on 19 October 2017. He finished fifth at the season-opening  2018  and took nine top-ten finishes. Alonso out-qualified his teammate Stoffel Vandoorne at every race and drove quickly and aggressively. Alonso was 11th in the Drivers' Championship with 50 points, and left the sport as a driver at the end of the 2018 season, citing a perceived lack of on-track racing, the predictability of results and felt discussions away from racing about the broadcast of radio transmissions and polemics harmed the series.

He remained at McLaren as a brand ambassador to aid and advise drivers and drove in select test sessions to develop their cars. Alonso drove the MCL34 during a two-day in-season post-race Bahrain test in April 2019 to develop tyres for Pirelli. No further runs were planned for him and McLaren focused on their current drivers. Alonso's ambassador contract with McLaren expired at the end of 2019, and was not renewed for 2020.

Alpine (2021–2022) 

Alonso was signed to drive for Alpine F1 Team for the  season, alongside Esteban Ocon, with Renault having rebranded the team under its new name. In preparation for his F1 return, Alonso performed four testing days driving the Renault R.S.18 and was quickest in the post-2020 season young driver's test driving the Renault R.S.20 for Renault. In his first race with Alpine at the 2021 Bahrain Grand Prix, Alonso was forced to retire after plastic debris entered his brake duct. At the 2021 Emilia Romagna Grand Prix he finished in 11th after qualifying 15th, with teammate Ocon finishing ahead in tenth, but both were upgraded one position after Kimi Räikkönen was penalised, giving Alonso his first points of the season.

In Hungary, Alonso temporarily led the race before he made a pit stop and fell to fourth, ahead of Lewis Hamilton. Teammate Ocon credited Alonso's defence against Hamilton with enabling him to achieve his first race victory. In August 2021, Alonso invoked an option to extend his contract for the  season. Alonso scored points in multiple races following the summer break, finishing sixth in the Netherlands, eighth in Italy, sixth in Russia, having run in third in Russia before being forced to pit under wet conditions, and third in Qatar. His third-place finish at Qatar was his first podium finish since the 2014 Hungarian Grand Prix.

For the 2022 season, Alonso remained with Alpine.

Aston Martin (2023–) 
Alonso joined Aston Martin on a multi-year deal in  alongside Lance Stroll. He joined the team because he wanted a multi-year contract extension, and Alpine was only willing to give him one more year in F1. 

On his Aston Martin debut at the 2023 Bahrain Grand Prix, Alonso finished in 3rd place, securing a podium finish. The following race at the 2023 Saudi Arabian Grand Prix marked his 100th podium, making him the sixth driver to have scored 100 podiums in his career.

Endurance racing
Alonso made his sports car endurance racing debut at the 1999 24 Hours of Barcelona. Paired with Antonio García, Salvi Delmuns and the journalist Pedro Fermín Flores, the quartet third in the M10 class and tenth overall in a Hyundai Accent. Alonso was due to enter the 2015 24 Hours of Le Mans with Porsche's Le Mans Prototype 1 team before Honda blocked it.

WeatherTech SportsCar Championship (2018–2019)

Alonso drove a Ligier JS P217 entered by United Autosports in the 2018 24 Hours of Daytona as preparation for the 24 Hours of Le Mans. Alonso, Philip Hanson and McLaren reserve driver Lando Norris qualified 13th and finished 38th after multiple mechanical issues affected the car during the race. Alonso returned to race in the 2019 24 Hours of Daytona with Wayne Taylor Racing. He shared a Cadillac DPi-V.R with Kamui Kobayashi, Renger van der Zande and Jordan Taylor. The quartet completed 593 laps to win the rain-shortened event.

FIA World Endurance Championship (2018–2019)

Brown discussed an entry for the 2018 24 Hours of Le Mans with Alonso and was prepared to consent to a switch to another team if certain circumstances were met. Alonso and Toyota held talks and agreed to compete in the 24 Hours of Le Mans. He visited Toyota's factory in Cologne for a seat fitting in a TS050 Hybrid in November 2017. Toyota entered Alonso into a post-season rookie test at the Bahrain International Circuit later that month. In January 2018, McLaren and Toyota reached an agreement to allow Alonso to enter the full 2018–19 FIA World Endurance Championship. He joined Sébastien Buemi and Kazuki Nakajima in Toyota's  8 TS050 Hybrid.

Alonso drove a 2018 TS050 Hybrid in a three-day test session at the Ciudad del Motor de Aragón in February and drove with no artificial lights in a 24-hour kart race as preparation.  He, Buemi and Nakajima won the LMP1 Drivers' Championship with five victories including the 2018 24 Hours of Le Mans and the 2019 24 Hours of Le Mans over the eight round season, though this was enhanced by their teammates Mike Conway, Kamui Kobayashi and José María López suffering a sensor issue while leading the 2019 6 Hours of Spa and then suffering a puncture while comfortably leading the 2019 24 Hours of Le Mans with an hour remaining. Alonso left the series at the end of the season.

IndyCar Series

McLaren Honda Andretti (2017)
Before the 2017 Australian Grand Prix, Zak Brown said to Alonso they should enter the 2017 Indianapolis 500 to which Alonso suggested he was joking. The idea later re-emerged in a conservation in Los Angeles and Alonso told Brown he was happy with the idea since McLaren had won it before. He and his manager Garcia Abad met Brown and Éric Boullier in China to talk more about the plan and said he would decide the next day. Alonso told Brown he wanted to race at Indianapolis and told him it was "a good decision for everyone: a win, win for myself, for F1, the fans, everyone'."  Brown then spoke to the IndyCar Series chief executive officer Mark Miles and discovered that there were no Honda-powered cars. Miles met the Andretti Autosport owner Michael Andretti, who got driver Stefan Wilson to agree to forego his planned entry in partnership with Michael Shank Racing and allow Alonso to drive instead.

Driving the No. 29 McLaren-Honda-Andretti Dallara DW12, he completed a three-stage rookie orientation programme at the Indianapolis Motor Speedway on 3 May. Alonso advanced to the Fast Nine shootout in qualifying and set the fifth-fastest four-lap average speed; in the race, he led four times for a total of 27 laps before his engine failed with 21 laps to go. Alonso was classified 24th.

McLaren Racing (2019)

McLaren began planning an entry for him in the 2019 IndyCar Series in August 2018 and would be supported by the series. Alonso tested a 2018-specification Andretti Autosport-entered Dallara DW12-Honda at the Barber Motorsports Park on 5 September. McLaren opted to enter just the 2019 Indianapolis 500 due to its focus on Formula One and collaborated with Carlin Motorsport in a logistical and technical partnership and signed an engine supply deal with Chevrolet. Alonso ventured to the McLaren Technology Centre in early March 2019 for a seat fitting to become comfortable in the No. 66 Dallara IR18-Chevrolet and its brake pedal was shifted away from his feet since it is used less in IndyCar than in Formula One. Andy Brown was Alonso's race engineer and his chief mechanic was Liam Dance. Alonso did not qualify after Juncos Racing's Kyle Kaiser demoted him to 34th. Reasons included a dismantled spare car needed to assembled and flown from Carlin's factory after Alonso crashed in practice. An error converting from the American imperial system to the British metric system caused his car to scrape along the tarmac surface and incorrect gear ratios slowed him.

Arrow McLaren SP (2020)
He entered the 2020 Indianapolis 500 with Arrow McLaren SP after an agreement with Andretti Autosports fell through.
Alonso had a crash during practice. He qualified 26th.
Alonso did manage to finish the race. He started 26th, was running 15th halfway through the race, and then ended up P21 and one lap down because of a clutch issue causing the team to manually start the car during every pit stop.

Off-road racing
Alonso entered the Dakar Rally with Toyota in 2020 following a five-month testing programme in Africa, Europe and the Middle East and driving a series of races to better himself. He raced in the Lichtenburg 400 in South Africa, the Rally du Maroc in Morocco and the Al Ula–Neom Rally in Saudi Arabia, with the five-time Dakar Rally bike class winner Marc Coma his co-driver. Alonso was third at the Al Ula-Neom Rally, which was his highest finish in three preparation events. With co-driver Coma, he finished the Dakar in 13th position with a best stage finish of second place. A stop for repairs on the second stage and a roll on the tenth lost him several hours in the general classification.

Driving style

Alonso is often regarded as one of the greatest F1 drivers in the history of the sport. Journalists and fellow drivers regarded Alonso as a fast and consistent driver who can extract additional pace from a car in all weathers and on all tracks. Fisichella said Alonso understands when to go faster and when to preserve his tyres in a race. Former racing driver and Sky Sports pundit Martin Brundle described Alonso as "Senna-like in his intimate feel for where the grip is" and cited the driver's knowledge on how much grip to use for the entry to a turn. He drives aggressively and uses a braking area to put a car into a corner without losing speed exiting it. This allows Alonso to keep it "on the edge of adhesion" and it has been observed during a qualifying session and the first laps of a race. 1979 world champion Jody Scheckter has criticised Alonso for causing problems in teams.  This opinion is shared by Christian Horner, who ruled out signing Alonso for Red Bull, as he caused chaos in previous teams.

Alonso's experience increased his awareness of events around him and competitors in a race and adjusted his situation to focus on the drivers' championship. Alonso is an all-round driver who can mount an apex and correct a sliding car to go faster. He is careful in finding the ideal feeling with his brakes and can apply the maximum amount of force with a fast response time. Alonso's physical strength contrasts his braking skill and regularly exceeded that limit without overdoing it on multiple conditions. According to Jonathan Noble of Motorsport.com, this allows Alonso to "create a kind of natural ABS – fully exploiting tyre grip to achieve greater speeds while turning without locking the wheels."

Helmet and career number
Alonso's helmet manufactured by Bieffe (2001), Arai (2003–2009, 2016), Schuberth (2010–2015)
Bell (2017–) sports the yellow and red colours of the flag of Spain with shades of blue from the Asturias flag coupled with two silver thunderbolt arrows derived from a remote control car he received as a present in his childhood on top. He changed its mainbase colour design when switching teams during his F1 career; in 2008 Alonso attached two pictures of a spade, ace and heart symbol to show he was a two-time world champion.

For three successive Monaco Grand Prix from 2011 to 2013 and at the 2011 Singapore Grand Prix, he wore a gold and white coloured helmet to replace the blue and yellow. At the following 2013 Indian Grand Prix, Alonso sported a white helmet to celebrate his total number of career points scored up to the preceding Japanese Grand Prix of 1571 and with the words "F1 points World Record" accompanied with a thank you message in English, French and Italian.

His final event for Ferrari at the 2014 Abu Dhabi Grand Prix saw him wear a helmet with a picture depicting a pit stop in that year in the colour red, signature of various team members and the flag of Italy in the centre. At the 2017 Indianapolis 500 and the 2017 United States Grand Prix, Alonso sported a black helmet with red, yellow and blue stripes around it and his race number. He revised the livery for the 2018 24 Hours of Daytona to white instead of black and had no stripes around the front. The back had the layout of the Daytona International Speedway and continued to have his usual blue, red and yellow colours.

In 2018 Alonso changed its front livery to be predominantly blue with the back top lighter blue and the rear red and yellow. His helmet for the 2018 Abu Dhabi Grand Prix was divided equally between the flag of Spain on the right with a blue-checkered pattern around its side. The yellow on that area was replaced by gold between two horizontal stripes in red and a thick vertical strip was added with a list of Alonso's 32 F1 race victories.

For the 2014 season, the FIA created a new regulation allowing drivers to select specific car numbers for use throughout their F1 career. Alonso requested the number 14 for it has been his lucky number since his world karting championship victory in a kart with number 14, at the age of 14, on 14 July 1996.

Image and impact
Nate Saunders of ESPN writes that Alonso "is one of the most eloquent speakers in F1 and one of the best at interacting with the media". He occasionally uses press conferences with the press to cultivate particular narratives of a story, convey himself as controlling the F1 driver market or as the one with knowledge of facts of a situation. Alonso dislikes fame and prefers a private life, with Chris Jenkins of USA Today describing him as shy. He has been noted for refraining from expensive habits and possessions.

Alonso's public persona has been noted as being different from his private personality. Fellow Spanish driver Carlos Sainz Jr. claimed "there are two Fernandos", alluding to Alonso's defensive nature when criticised because of his shyness, compared to his sense of humour, generosity and kind-nature when not racing. According to the Autosport journalist Ben Anderson, Alonso's success in F1 required him to behave egotistically and selfishly and to have a self-confidence, in order to cope with the consequences of "burst[ing] egotistical bubbles" to improve himself. Alonso acknowledged the façade and told Anderson "I know who I am outside of F1, but that remains a question mark for everybody because I like to separate my personal life from my professional life" and his different personality traits in public and private. Alonso made a voice cameo appearance as an anthropomorphic version of himself in the Spanish dub of Cars 2 (2011), and a voice command assistant in the Spanish dub of Cars 3 (2017).

Journalist Nigel Roebuck calls Alonso "the first world-class racing driver to come out of Spain", and is credited for popularising F1 in the country, where it was once considered a fringe sport and a lesser known form of motorsport than motorcycling and rallying. He was Personality Media's favourite male athlete with a 99 per cent recognition rating amongst the Spanish public in 2015; in the latter part of his F1 career, Alonso was within the top two most popular drivers in the Grand Prix Drivers' Association fan surveys of 2010, 2015 and 2017.

The Fernando Alonso Sports Complex in Oviedo was opened in June 2015 and features a CIK-FIA compliant karting track featuring 29 layouts. A museum dedicated to his racing career, the 'Museo y Circuito Fernando Alonso', opened in the same year, featuring Alonso's race cars, helmets, overalls, and memorabilia.

Endorsements and philanthropy

Alonso has done business with Banco Santander, Cajastur, TAG Heuer, Europcar, Silestone, Liberbank, ING, Chandon, Adidas, and Bang & Olufsen. He is the founder and brand ambassador of the fashion retailer Kimoa, and intended to establish the Fernando Alonso Cycling Team to compete in UCI events in 2015 before the project failed to materialise. As a result of Alonso's endorsement money and F1 salary, he has been listed as one of the world's highest-paid athletes by Forbes every year from 2012 to 2018. The magazine named him motorsport's top-earning driver from June 2012 to June 2013, one of 2016's top earning international stars, and one of 2017's highest-paid international and European celebrities. Alonso also featured on the Forbes Celebrity 100 list in 2008 and 2017. In 2020, Alonso was sponsored by Ruoff Mortgage for his Indianapolis 500 attempt.

In November 2017 Alonso established the FA Racing G2 Logitech G eSports racing team of which he is the team principal and competes in virtual online racing championships on multiple platforms. The team dissolved in 2018 and launched another in partnership with FA Racing and Veloce Esports in March 2019. Alonso's team has also competed in the F4 Spanish Championship, Formula Renault Eurocup and karting. He is an investor and board member of the eSports multi-racing platform Motorsport Games.

The UNICEF Spanish Committee named Alonso a UNICEF Goodwill Ambassador in February 2005 to promote and defend children's rights and awareness of UNICEF. Alonso promoted India's efforts to eradicate polio in 2011 and handwashing with soap to school children in 2012, whilst he also supported UNICEF's anti-cyberbullying campaign in November 2017. Alonso founded the Fundación Fernando Alonso in 2007 to promote motor racing and road safety education.

Awards
Alonso received the 2003 Autosport Gregor Grant Award for winning the 2003 Hungarian Grand Prix. He also won the Princess Cristina National Sports Award for sporting newcomer in that year. Alonso was named the Lorenzo Bandini Trophy's recipient in April 2005. From October 2005 to May 2006 he received the Prince of Asturias Award for Sports, the Premios Nacionales del Deporte Sportsman of the Year Award and the Gold Medal of the Royal Order of Sports Merit for winning the 2005 F1 World Championship.

He was named the 2006 Autosport International Racing Driver of the Year. Alonso was voted the Indianapolis 500 Rookie of the Year for his performance in the 2017 Indianapolis 500. He was inducted into the FIA Hall of Fame in 2017 for being a F1 World Champion and again as a FIA World Endurance Champion in 2019. This made Alonso the first driver to have been inducted into the FIA Hall of Fame twice.

Personal life

From November 2006 to December 2011, Alonso was married to Raquel del Rosario, the lead singer of the Spanish pop band El Sueño de Morfeo. Since 2022, Alonso has been in a relationship with Austrian television presenter Andrea Schlager. Alonso supports the Real Madrid and Real Oviedo football teams, and is a cycling enthusiast. He is 174 cm (5'9") tall, and speaks English, French, Italian and Spanish.

Karting record

Karting career summary

Racing record

Racing career summary 

 Season still in progress.

Complete Euro Open by Nissan results
(key) (Races in bold indicate pole position; races in italics indicate fastest lap)

Complete International Formula 3000 results
(key) (Races in bold indicate pole position; races in italics indicate fastest lap)

Complete Formula One results
(key) (Races in bold indicate pole position; races in italics indicate fastest lap; small number indicates the finishing position)

 Did not finish, but was classified as he had completed more than 90% of the race distance.
 Season still in progress.

American open-wheel racing results

IndyCar Series

Indianapolis 500

IMSA WeatherTech SportsCar Championship
(key) (Races in bold indicate pole position; races in italics indicate fastest lap)

24 Hours of Daytona

Complete FIA World Endurance Championship results
(key) (Races in bold indicate pole position; races in italics indicate fastest lap)

24 Hours of Le Mans results

Dakar Rally results

Records held
He broke the record for the longest distance covered in F1 with a total of 92,643 Kilometers driven after his fifth-place finish in the 2022 British Grand Prix.

Notes and references

Notes

References

External links

 
 Profile – from Formula 1 official website
 Profile – from McLaren official website
 Career statistics
 Fernando Alonso statistics
 

 
1981 births
24 Hours of Daytona drivers
24 Hours of Le Mans drivers
24 Hours of Le Mans winning drivers
Alpine Formula One drivers
Aston Martin Formula One drivers
Ferrari Formula One drivers
FIA World Endurance Championship drivers
Formula One race winners
Formula One World Drivers' Champions
Indianapolis 500 drivers
Indianapolis 500 Rookies of the Year
IndyCar Series drivers
International Formula 3000 drivers
Karting World Championship drivers
Living people
McLaren Formula One drivers
Minardi Formula One drivers
People named in the Paradise Papers
Renault Formula One drivers
Spanish atheists
Spanish expatriate sportspeople in England
Spanish expatriate sportspeople in Switzerland
Spanish Formula One drivers
Spanish racing drivers
Sportspeople from Oviedo
UNICEF Goodwill Ambassadors
WeatherTech SportsCar Championship drivers
Campos Racing drivers
Team Astromega drivers
Toyota Gazoo Racing drivers
Arrow McLaren SP drivers
United Autosports drivers
Andretti Autosport drivers
Wayne Taylor Racing drivers